Melby is an unincorporated community in Douglas County, in the U.S. state of Minnesota.

History
A post office called Melby was in operation from 1888 until 1978. Melby was platted in 1902.

References

Unincorporated communities in Douglas County, Minnesota
Unincorporated communities in Minnesota